Pauline Heinz (born 1 May 2001) is a field hockey player from Germany, who plays as a midfielder.

Career

Club hockey
In the German Bundesliga, Heinz plays club hockey for Rüsselsheimer Ruder-Klub 08.

National teams

Under–18
In 2018, Heinz was a member of the German U–18 team at the EuroHockey Youth Championship in Santander.

Under–21
Heinz has a number of caps for the German U–21 team. Her most prominent appearance came at the 2019 EuroHockey Junior Championship in Valenica, where the team finished in third place.

Die Danas
In 2019, Heinz made her debut for the German national team during a test series against Argentina in Buenos Aires. In December 2019, Heinz was named in the preliminary German Olympic squad to train for the 2020 Summer Olympics in Tokyo.

References

External links
 
 
 
 
 

1999 births
Living people
Female field hockey midfielders
German female field hockey players
Feldhockey Bundesliga (Women's field hockey) players
Field hockey players at the 2020 Summer Olympics
Olympic field hockey players of Germany
21st-century German women